"Right Beside You" is a song by American singer-songwriter Sophie B. Hawkins, released in July 1994 as the first single from her second album, Whaler (1994). The song reached number 56 on the US Billboard Hot 100 and number seven on the Canadian RPM Top Singles chart. In Europe, it became a top 30 hit in several countries, including Switzerland, where it climbed to number eight. The track is Hawkins' highest-charting single in the United Kingdom, where it reached number 13.

Critical reception
Larry Flick from Billboard wrote, "Matching the wickedly catchy 1992 smash "Damn I Wish I Was Your Lover" is a daunting task. On this peek into the quirky pop poet's sophomore collection, Whaler, she takes a conscious step into the dance/pop arena by offering a kicky ditty that is not as instantly memorable as her breakthrough hit, but ultimately just as strong and durable." He added, "Hawkins delivers an urgent and breathy vocal that may draw comparisons to Madonna, though her own unique style shines through to smarter ears. The single has two rock-solid mixes that will do the trick in enticing top 40, club, and rhythm-crossover programmers. Sweet." Troy J. Augusto from Cash Box named it Pick of the Week, saying, "Slick, danceable track indicates a modest, though thoroughly satisfying, style shift for the lovely Ms. Hawkins who looks to clubs for exposure this time as much as hit radio. Husky and oh-so-seductive vocal delivery makes the difference here, and with nifty remixes offered, looks for almost immediate impact." 

Chuck Campbell from Knoxville News Sentinel felt that the single "is her best chance at renewed fame. Although it's a shallow neo-disco song, and she sounds uncomfortably like Debbie Gibson, at least it has a catchy chorus." Pan-European magazine Music & Media commented, "Artistically seen, "Damn I Wish I Was Your Lover" promoted her overnight to a top position deft beside Cyndi Lauper, and there's still no reason to revise our opinion." James Hamilton from Music Weeks RM Dance Update also described it as a "Madonna-ish canterer". Jonathan Bernstein from Spin remarked, "You can almost hear the waves crash through the opening techno sea-shanty of "Right Beside You"."

Music video
The song's accompanying music video was directed by Albert Watson, with Tony Phillips as the director of photography and Craig Fanning as executive producer. Before the shoot, Hawkins was learning horseback riding and one of her managers suggested she ride a horse in the upcoming video. Watson liked the idea and felt the song's sound suited a beach setting for the video. The video was shot on a beach near Sag Harbor, New York, in the summer of 1994 during stormy conditions.

Track listings

 US CD single "Right Beside You" (album version) – 4:47
 "Right Beside You" (radio 7-inch mix) – 4:11
 "Right Beside You" (classic club mix) – 5:55
 "Right Beside You" (hard floor mix) – 5:30
 "The Ballad of Sleeping Beauty" – 5:04

 US and UK cassette single "Right Beside You" (album version)
 "The Ballad of Sleeping Beauty"

 UK CD1 "Right Beside You" (radio 7-inch mix)
 "Right Beside You" (classic club mix)
 "Right Beside You" (hard floor mix)
 "The Ballad of Sleeping Beauty"

 UK CD2 "Right Beside You" (LP version)
 "Right Beside You" (extended Brain remix)
 "Right Beside You" (7-inch Brain remix)
 "Damn I Wish I Was Your Lover" (LP version)

 European maxi-CD single "Right Beside You" – 4:46
 "Right Beside You" (classic club mix) – 5:55
 "The Ballad of Sleeping Beauty" – 5:04
 "Right Beside You" (extended Brain remix) – 7:32

 Japanese CD single'
 "Right Beside You" (album version)
 "Right Beside You" (radio 7-inch mix)
 "Right Beside You" (hard floor mix)

Charts

Weekly charts

Year-end charts

References

External links
 Full lyrics at official website
 Ask Sophie - December 2004 - with some questions related to "Right Beside You"

Sophie B. Hawkins songs
1994 singles
1994 songs
1996 singles
Song recordings produced by Stephen Lipson
Songs written by Rick Chertoff
Songs written by Sophie B. Hawkins
Songs written by Stewart Lerman
Columbia Records singles